Gaolou (高楼) may refer to the following locations in China:

 Gaolou, Lingbi County, town in Lingbi County, Anhui
 Gaolou, Sanhe, town in Hebei
 Gaolou, Rui'an, town in Rui'an, Zhejiang
 Gaolou Township, Qingcheng County, in Qingcheng County, Gansu
 Gaolou Township, Tianshui, in Wushan County, Gansu
 Gaolou Township, Weishan County, Shandong, in Weishan County, Shandong